Belait can refer to either:
 Belait District of Brunei Darussalam
 Kuala Belait, the administrative town of the Belait District
 Belait (river) which flows through the Belait District of Brunei Darussalam.
 Belait people, an ethnic group indigenous to the Belait District
 Belait language, part of the Malayo-Polynesian group of languages.
 Belait, a variant of Vilāyat (Hindi विलायत, Urdu ولایت), used in India to refer to Great Britain (and sometimes Europe more generally), via Persian from the Arabic ولاية, wilāyah